The Isle Of Wight Festival 2008 was the seventh revived Isle of Wight Festival held at Seaclose Park in Newport on the Isle Of Wight. The event took place between 13 June – 15 June 2008. 

Tickets went on sale in December 2007 and were sold out within weeks.

This year was the first time that the festival was screened live on TV. After four years of highlights packages being broadcast on Channel 4, this year ITV announced that they had won the rights to broadcast live on ITV2. There were live programmes on each of the three days; starting at 11:00pm on Friday, Saturday and Sunday and contain mainly highlights of the days performances, along with live coverage of the headliners' sets.

Line up

Main stage

Friday
 Kaiser Chiefs
 N.E.R.D as special guest.
 KT Tunstall
 The Hoosiers
 The Wombats
 Joe Lean and the Jing Jang Jong
 The Answer

Saturday
 Sex Pistols
 Ian Brown as special guest.
 Iggy & The Stooges
 The Zutons
 The Enemy
 Kate Nash
 The Cribs
 Amy Macdonald
 One Night Only
 Black Stone Cherry
 Kosmik Debris

Sunday
 The Police
 The Kooks as special guest.
 James
 Starsailor
 Scouting For Girls
 Newton Faulkner
 Delays
 We See Lights
 Proximity Effect

The Big Top

Thursday (campers only)
 Björn Again
 Suspiciously Elvis

Friday
 The Stranglers
 Curved Air
 The Duke Spirit
 Arno Carstens

Saturday
 Sugababes
 The Australian Pink Floyd Show
 Arno Carstens
 Stone Gods

Sunday
 Feeder
 New Young Pony Club
 The Music
 Arno Carstens

Appearing over the weekend, in the Big Top were Stone Gods and New Young Pony Club, amongst other acts.

References

External links 

Isle of Wight Festival
Isle Of Wight Festival MySpace Site
festival Organisers Solo Homepage

2008
2008 in British music
2008 in England
21st century on the Isle of Wight